Franklyn de Winton Lushington (29 March 1868 – 30 March 1941) was Archdeacon of Malta from 1901 until 1903.

Lushington was  born in Madras, educated at Clare College, Cambridge and ordained in 1894. In 1899 he married Monica Sydney Sanderson in Elstree where he was an assistant master at the preparatory school. In 1911 he became Headmaster  of Dover College, leaving to become a Chaplain to the Forces during World War I. After  the war he was the Incumbent at Danehill then King's Langley.

Notes

Christian clergy from Chennai
Heads of schools in England
Alumni of Clare College, Cambridge
Archdeacons of Malta
20th-century Maltese Anglican priests
19th-century English Anglican priests
1868 births
1941 deaths
People from Danehill, East Sussex
People from Kings Langley
20th-century English Anglican priests